Chiasm may refer to:

 Chiasm (musical project), an electronic music project by Emileigh Rohn
 Chiasm (anatomy), an X-shaped structure produced by the crossing over of the fibers, with the prefix chiasm- means cross examples include:
 A nerval chiasm, where either two nerves cross in the body midline (e.g. Optic chiasma)
 A crossing of fibres inside a nerve reversing their mapping
 A tendinous chiasm, the spot where two tendons cross. The tendon of the flexor digitorum longus muscle forms two: the crural chiasm (with the tendon of the tibialis posterior muscle) and the plantar chiasm (with the tendon of the flexor hallucis longus muscle).
 Chiasma (genetics), the point where two chromatids are intertwined (interwoven) in a cell
 An instantiation of chiasmus

See also
 Chiasmetes, a genus of beetles
 Chiasmus, the figure of speech in which two or more clauses are related to each other through a reversal of structures in order to make a larger point; that is, the clauses display inverted parallelism
 Chiasmus (cipher), a German government block cipher
 Chiastic structure, a literary device for chiasmus applied to narrative motifs, turns of phrase, or whole passages